WILX-TV (channel 10) is a television station licensed to Onondaga, Michigan, United States, serving as the NBC affiliate for the Lansing area. Owned by Gray Television, the station maintains studios on American Road (near I-96) in Lansing, and its transmitter is located in Onondaga.

WLNM-LD (channel 29) in Lansing operates as a translator of WILX-TV, allowing homes with issues receiving WILX-TV's VHF signal or only a UHF antenna to receive WILX-TV in some form.

History
The station signed on March 15, 1959 and was owned by Jackson Telecasters along with WJCO radio (1510 AM, now WJKN). Jackson Telecasters was half-owned by Lansing Broadcasting, owner of WILS (1320 AM), from which channel 10 took its calls.

WILX shared the analog VHF channel 10 frequency with WMSB, an educational station owned by Michigan State University. That outlet was originally WKAR-TV, broadcasting on UHF channel 60. However, it had difficulty getting viewers because television sets were not required to have UHF tuning until 1964. Viewers had to buy an expensive converter to watch WKAR and usually the picture was not clear even with one. Looking for a way to increase its viewership, MSU agreed to share channel 10 with WILX, renaming WKAR as WMSB for that purpose. As such, WMSB was located on MSU's campus in East Lansing while WILX was licensed to Onondaga with studios in Jackson, the market's second-largest city. However, both stations shared the same tower and transmitter in Onondaga.

WILX occupied channel 10 for about 70 percent of the broadcast day, including all of prime time. In the event breaking news occurred, or a sporting event or special on NBC was scheduled during WMSB's allocated time, that station would often cede its time to WILX. This arrangement continued until MSU restarted WKAR on UHF channel 23 in 1972.

Jackson Telecasters sold WILX to Figgie Communications in 1978. Figgie then sold it to Adams Communications in 1983. The station went through two more ownership changes: Brissette Broadcasting in 1991, and finally Benedek Broadcasting in 1996 before it was acquired by current owner Gray Television. Benedek filed for bankruptcy in March 2002. In April 2002, Gray Communications indicated that they would acquire Benedek's assets. FCC granted approval of WILX transfer to Gray on August 29, 2002.

WILX-TV affiliated a subchannel with The Local AccuWeather Channel in late 2006. Construction permit for permanent digital equipment is granted in April 2008, and its digital signal was broadcast on channel 57.

On February 14, 2020, Tri-State Christian Television agreed to sell WLNM-LD to Gray for $175,000; the sale, which was completed on May 1, includes a lease agreement allowing TCT to program a WLNM subchannel for five years after closing.

Subchannel history

WILX-DT2
WILX-DT2 is the Heroes & Icons-affiliated second digital subchannel of WILX-TV, broadcasting in widescreen standard definition on channel 10.2.

WILX-DT2 started in 2006 by affiliating with AccuWeather; in late 2014, it was changed to WeatherNation TV. In October 2016, WeatherNation was replaced with Heroes & Icons.

WILX-DT3
WILX-DT3 is the Circle-owned-and-operated third digital subchannel of WILX-TV, broadcasting in widescreen standard definition on channel 10.3. WILX-DT3 also carries Xploration Station on weekends in place of WSYM-TV.

WILX-DT4
WILX-DT4 is the Ion Television-affiliated fourth digital channel of WILX-TV, broadcasting in standard definition on channel 10.4.

Prior to WILX-DT4's affiliation, the Lansing/Jackson market was one of the two television markets in Michigan to not have an over-the-air affiliate of Ion (the other being Alpena). The network was formerly seen via Grand Rapids-based WZPX-TV until 2019 when that station moved its transmitter from Vermontville Township to the Gun Lake area between Grand Rapids and Kalamazoo. WLNS-TV had carried Ion on its third digital subchannel until June 11, 2018 when it discontinued the 6.3 subchannel. WILX-DT4 affiliated with Ion on December 20, 2019.

Programming

Syndicated programming
Syndicated programming seen on WILX-TV includes Rachael Ray, The Kelly Clarkson Show, Wheel of Fortune, and Jeopardy! among others.

News operation

As of 2021, WILX currently broadcasts 30½ hours of locally produced newscasts each week (with 5½ hours each weekday and 3 hours each on Saturdays and Sundays).

WILX broadcasts news on weekdays from 5-7 a.m., a half hour midday newscast at 11 a.m., and in the afternoon at 4, 5 and 6 p.m. with an evening broadcast at 11 p.m. Weekends from 6-8 a.m. on weekend mornings, and 6 and 11 p.m. weekend evenings.

For many years, WILX's main studios were on Springport Road in Jackson while it operated a newsroom in Downtown Lansing. In the early 1960s, it maintained one-camera studios in Battle Creek and Lansing, which originated two-minute local news segments from those cities during the late evening news broadcasts. In the early-1990s under the ownership of Brissette Broadcasting, the station's operations were consolidated into its current studio complex in Lansing on American Road.
	
For most of its history, WILX was a distant runner-up to long-dominant WLNS-TV in the local Nielsen ratings. Sometime in the early-2000s, however, channel 10 overtook WLNS for the first time ever and has maintained a narrow if consistent lead since.
	
Its weekday morning show News 10 Today was launched in 1990 as a local news segment during Today eventually expanding to the current two-and-a-half-hour-long broadcast. Since its weekday noon show was canceled in the late-1990s, the station has not offered a newscast during the midday hours unlike most other NBC affiliates until September 2021 when WILX started a midday newscast at 11 am.
 	
In 2004, WILX entered into a news share agreement with Fox affiliate WSYM-TV (then owned by Journal Communications). This came about after that channel shut down its news department due to financial reasons. Under the arrangement, WILX produces newscasts for WSYM weeknights at 6:30 (for a half-hour) and every night at 10 (for an hour). In October 2015, WILX began producing a two-hour morning show on WSYM titled Fox 47 Morning News at 7. Prior to this newscast's launch, on weekday mornings at 9, the previous late-night's prime time show was replayed on WSYM under the title Fox 47 Morning News Rewind. The weekend version of the Morning News Rewind continues to air at 6 a.m. on Saturday and Sunday morning.

Although the two share most personnel, WILX and WSYM maintain separate weeknight anchors and meteorologists. On occasion such as severe weather, WSYM may carry the primary feed from WILX where its meteorologists appear on the other. This channel operates its own weather radar known as "Pinpoint Doppler Radar" at its studios.

On July 7, 2014, WILX launched the first 4 p.m. newscast in the Lansing–Jackson market, titled First@4. On October 1, 2018, WILX added a 5:30 p.m. newscast. At the same time, the station cancelled its 4:00 p.m. newscast. As a result, the station broadcasts news for 90 minutes straight, with newscasts at 5:00 p.m., 5:30 p.m., and 6:00 p.m. Monday through Friday. Also on that date, the 5:30 newscast that WILX had been producing on WSYM moved to 6:30 p.m.

Notable former on-air staff
Jim Brandstatter – sportscaster (1975–1978)
Ahmed Fareed – sports anchor (2004–2005)
Chris Hansen – reporter (1981)
Ben Holden – sports anchor/reporter (1998–2004)
Matt Morrison – sports
Dan Ponce – anchor/reporter (2005–2006)

Technical information

Subchannels
The station's digital signal is multiplexed:

Analog-to-digital conversion
WILX-TV shut down its analog signal, over VHF channel 10, on February 17, 2009, the original target date in which full-power television stations in the United States were to transition from analog to digital broadcasts under federal mandate (which was later pushed back to June 12, 2009). The station's digital signal relocated from its pre-transition UHF channel 57, which was among the high band UHF channels (52-69) that were removed from broadcasting use as a result of the transition, to its analog-era VHF channel 10.

References

External links

NBC network affiliates
MeTV affiliates
Heroes & Icons affiliates
Circle (TV network) affiliates
Ion Television affiliates
Antenna TV affiliates
True Crime Network affiliates
Gray Television
Television channels and stations established in 1959
ILX-TV
1959 establishments in Michigan